The 2017–18 season is the 70th season of competitive football in Israel, and the 92nd season under the Israeli Football Association, established in 1928, during the British Mandate.

Promotion and relegation

Pre–season

IFA competitions

League competitions

2017–18 Israeli Premier League

2017–18 Ligat Nashim

Cup competitions

2017–18 Israel State Cup

2017–18 Israeli Women's Cup

2017–18 Toto Cup Al

2017 Israel Super  Cup

International Club Competitions

UEFA Champions League

Second qualifying round

Third qualifying round

Play-off round

UEFA Europa League

First qualifying round

Second qualifying round

Third qualifying round

Play-off round

Group stage

Group A

Group G

UEFA Women's Champions League

Group 6

UEFA Youth League

First round (Champions Path)

National Teams

National team

2018 FIFA World Cup qualifying

2017–18 matches

Women's National Team

2019 Women's World Cup qualification

2017–18 matches

U-21 National team

2019 European U-21 qualifying round (Group 5)

2017–18 matches

U-19 National team

2018 UEFA European Under-19 Championship qualification

Qualifying round

2017–18 matches

U-19 Women's National team

2018 UEFA Women's Under-19 Championship qualification

Qualifying round

2017–18 matches

U-17 National team

2018 UEFA European Under-17 Championship qualification

Qualifying round

Elite round

2018 UEFA European Under-17 Championship

Group stage

2017–18 matches

U-17 Women's National team

2018 UEFA Women's Under-17 Championship qualification

Qualifying round

Elite round

2017–18 results

Notes

References

 
Seasons in Israeli football